Forsebia mendozina is a moth of the family Erebidae. It is found in the Andes Mountains of Peru and Argentina.

References

Melipotini
Moths described in 1926